Kellett is a surname. Notable people with the surname include:

Al Kellett (1901–1960), relief pitcher in US Major League Baseball
Bob Kellett (1927–2012), English film director, film producer and screenwriter
Brian Kellett, rugby league footballer of the 1980s (son of Cyril Kellett)
Cyril Kellett (1937–1993), English rugby league footballer of the 1950s, 1960s and 1970s (father of Brian Kellett)
Dave Kellett, American cartoonist
Edward Kellett (New Zealand politician) (1865–1922), New Zealand Member of Parliament for Dunedin North
Edward Orlando Kellett (died 1943), British Member of Parliament and British Army officer
Edward Kellett-Bowman (born 1931), British business and management consultant
Dame Elaine Kellett-Bowman (1923–2014), British Conservative politician
Gloria Calderon Kellett, American writer and actress
Sir Henry Kellett (1806–1875), British naval officer and explorer
Ken Kellett (born 1953), English rugby league footballer of the 1970s and 1980s
Rebecca Kellett (born 1986), British businesswoman
Les Kellett (1915–2002), English professional wrestler
Red Kellett (1909–1970), President and General Manager of the 'Baltimore Colts' American football team
Ronald Gustave Kellett (1909–1998), Royal Air Force pilot in the Battle of Britain
Stephen Jonathan Kellett (1990–Present), Estate Agent in Preston, Lancashire.